Brij Behari Lal Butail (or BBL Butail) is an Indian Politician from Palampur. He was MLA of Palampur and he was the 12th Speaker of Himachal Pradesh Legislative Assembly. He retired from politics in 2017 and his son Ashish Butail was elected as MLA of Palampur in January 2018.

Early life and education
He was born on 25 July 1941 to Lala Bansi Lal Butail and Smt. Satyavati Butail in Bundla, Palampur. Butails have contributed to the politics of Palampur since the Independence. His father and grandfather, Lala Kanhiya Lal Butail were freedom fighters. His grandfather was also the first representative of Palampur after India's independence. After him, his elder brother Kunj Behari Lal Butail became the MLA.

He did his schooling in Palampur and later earned the degree of B.A. and L.L.B. from University of Delhi.

Butails have had cordial relations with the central leaders of the INC like Indira Gandhi and Rajiv Gandhi and current representatives like Sonia Gandhi and Rahul Gandhi.

Politics and career
He was elected to State Legislative Assembly for the first time in 1985 and again in 1993, 1998, 2003 and 2012. After his victory in 2012 elections, he was unanimously elected as the Speaker of the H.P. Vidhan Sabha. He has held the post of Chief Parliamentary Secretary and had independent charge for Food & Civil supplies department. He was attached to the Chief Minister for Public Relations, Public Works and Housing Departments. He was also the Revenue Minister and Political Advisor to the Chief Minister. He retired from politics as Speaker of the H.P. Vidhan Sabha after his term ended in 2017. His son Ashish Butail succeeded him and is the current MLA from Palampur.

Personal life
He married Smt. Beena Butail in 1966. They have one son and three daughters. He had helped the Co-operative Tea Industry to attain viability and is the chairman, Kangra Co-operative Tea Factory, Palampur. He also serves as the President of KLBDAV College and Vice President, DAV Public School, Palampur. He was also known to be the richest legislator of Himachal Pradesh.

References

1941 births
Living people
Himachal Pradesh MLAs 2003–2007
Himachal Pradesh MLAs 2012–2017
Indian National Congress politicians from Himachal Pradesh
People from Kangra, Himachal Pradesh
Speakers of the Himachal Pradesh Legislative Assembly